Norra Riksten (also Riksten or Riksten friluftsstad) is a locality situated in Botkyrka Municipality, Stockholm County, Sweden with 839 inhabitants in 2010.

References 

Stockholm urban area
Populated places in Botkyrka Municipality
Södermanland